The Men's Allam British Open 2018 is the men's edition of the 2018 British Open Squash Championships, which is a PSA World Series event (Prize money : 165,000 $). The event took place at the Airco Arena in Hull in England from 13 to 20 May. Miguel Ángel Rodríguez won his first British Open trophy, beating Mohamed El Shorbagy in the final.

Seeds

Draw and results

See also
2018 Women's British Open Squash Championship
2018–19 PSA Men's World Squash Championship

References

2010s in Kingston upon Hull
Men's British Open
Men's British Open
British Open Squash Championships
Men's British Open Squash Championships
Men's sport in the United Kingdom
Sport in Kingston upon Hull
Squash in England